Noman Chowdhury (born 15 August 2001) is a Bangladeshi cricketer. He made his first-class debut on 10 October 2019, for Chittagong Division in the 2019–20 National Cricket League. In February 2021, he was selected in the Bangladesh Emerging squad for their home series against the Ireland Wolves. He made his Twenty20 debut on 7 June 2021, for Khelaghar Samaj Kallyan Samity in the 2021 Dhaka Premier Division Twenty20 Cricket League.

References

External links
 

2001 births
Living people
Bangladeshi cricketers
Chittagong Division cricketers
Khelaghar Samaj Kallyan Samity cricketers
Place of birth missing (living people)